Castello Normanno Lighthouse is an active lighthouse located in Castellammare del Golfo at the northern extremity of the tip of the harbour.

Description
The lighthouse is completely automated, powered by a solar unit and is operated by the Marina Militare with the identification code number 2922 E.F.

See also
 List of lighthouses in Italy
 Castellammare del Golfo

References

External links

 Servizio Fari Marina Militare

Lighthouses in Italy